Oleg Valeryevich Smirnov (born 1 October 1990) is a Russian professional football player. He plays for FC Volgar Astrakhan.

Club career
He made his Russian Football National League debut for FC Tambov on 11 July 2016 in a game against FC SKA-Khabarovsk.

External links
 

1990 births
People from Shakhunya
Sportspeople from Nizhny Novgorod Oblast
Living people
Russian footballers
Association football goalkeepers
FC Volga Nizhny Novgorod players
FC Khimik Dzerzhinsk players
FC Nizhny Novgorod (2007) players
FC Sever Murmansk players
FC Tambov players
FC Tom Tomsk players
FC Mordovia Saransk players
FC Nizhny Novgorod (2015) players
FC Volgar Astrakhan players
Russian First League players
Russian Second League players